Rasputin, the Black Monk is a lost 1917 American silent drama film directed by Arthur Ashley and starring Montagu Love. It was produced and distributed by World Film Company.

Cast
Montagu Love as Gregory Novik/Rasputin
Henry Hull as Kerensky
June Elvidge as Inez, Raff's wife
Arthur Ashley as Raff
Violet Axzelle as Ilda, as a child (*as Violet Axzell)
Lillian Cook as Ilda, Raff's daughter - as an adult
Bertram Grassby as Alexus
Irving Cummings as Prince Felix
Julia Dean as Madame Vasta, Lady in Waiting
Pinna Nesbit as Princess Sonia
Hubert Wilke as Czar Andre
Florence Beresford as Czarina Katherine
Charles Crompton as Paulus
Frank Beamish as Choynski, Russian Secret Service
Joseph Granby as Mikula Dvorkin, leader of Duma

References

External links
Rasputin, The Black Monk at IMDb.com

1917 films
American silent feature films
American black-and-white films
World Film Company films
Lost American films
Silent American drama films
1917 drama films
1917 lost films
Lost drama films
1910s American films
1910s English-language films